Tachyerges is a genus of beetles belonging to the family Curculionidae.

The species of this genus are found in Europe and Northern America.

Species:
 Tachyerges salicis
 Tachyerges stigma

References

Curculionidae
Curculionidae genera